Emydura australis, the northern red-faced turtle, is a medium-sized aquatic turtle inhabiting rivers, streams and permanent water bodies across much of northern Australia.

References

australis
Reptiles described in 1841
Turtles of Australia